Frode Sørensen (born 21 January 1946 at Toftlund) was a member of the Danish parliament representing the Social Democrats. He was Tax Minister from 21 December 2000 to 27 November 2001. He was a Member of Parliament (Folketinget) from 11 March 1998 - 13 November 2007.

References

1946 births
Living people
Government ministers of Denmark
Members of the Folketing
Social Democrats (Denmark) politicians
Danish Tax Ministers
People from Tønder Municipality